S Tel Private Limited was a GSM based cellular operator in India. It was owned jointly by Chinakannan Sivasankaran. (51%) and Bahrain Telecommunications (49%). On 2 February 2012 Supreme Court of India cancelled all 122 spectrum licences granted during the tenure of former communications minister A Raja. Six licences of S Tel were cancelled, and Batelco sold its stake in S Tel. The sale was completed in late 2012.

Controversy

License cancelled by Supreme Court

On 2 February 2012, The Supreme Court of India cancelled all 122 spectrum licences granted during the tenure of former communications minister A Raja, including the 6 licenses granted to S Tel. The Supreme Court of India also imposed a fine of  50 lakh on S Tel.

Batelco sells stake
On 8 February 2012, a few days after The Supreme Court ruling, Batelco sold its 42.7% share of S Tel to Sky City Foundation Ltd of India for 65.8 million Bahraini dinar (US$174.5 million). Batelco's Group Chief Executive Shaikh Mohamed bin Isa Al Khalifa said in a statement, "BMIC Limited, a 100 per cent Batelco-owned subsidiary company, entered into an agreement, in the fourth quarter of 2011 to sell its 42.7 per cent stake in S Tel for USD 174.5 million to its Indian partner, Sky City Foundation Limited". The sale was to be completed by the end of October 2012.

Current status
S Tel services is no longer available in India following the cancellation of its six UAS licenses on 17 February 2012. On 29 February 2012 it was reported that S Tel boss Sivasankaran wrote to Manmohan Singh, former Prime Minister of India, demanding Rs. 1700 Crore investment while offering to surrender its licenses.

References

External links 

Telecommunications companies of India
Mobile phone companies of India
Companies based in Gurgaon
Defunct brands
Telecommunications companies established in 2008
Telecommunications companies disestablished in 2012
Indian companies established in 2008
Indian companies disestablished in 2012
2008 establishments in Haryana